Maigret and the Lazy Burglar (also translated as Maigret and the Idle Burglar) is a detective novel by Belgian writer Georges Simenon, featuring his character Inspector Jules Maigret.

Other titles
The book has been translated three times into English: in 1963 by Daphne Woodward as Maigret and the Lazy Burglar, in 2003 as Maigret and the Idle Burglar, and in 2018 by Howard Curtis as Maigret and the Lazy Burglar.

Adaptations
The 81st episode of the French television series "Les Enquêtes du commissaire Maigret", directed by Jean-Marie Coldefy with Jean Richard in the lead role, is based on the novel.

Translations
The book is translated into the Georgian language as მეგრე და ზარმაცი ქურდი, by Nani Madzaghua.

External links

Maigret at trussel.com

References 

1961 Belgian novels
Maigret novels
Novels set in France
Novels set in the 20th century